Crematogaster aloysiisabaudiae is a species of ant in tribe Crematogastrini. It was described by Menozzi in 1930.

References

aloysiisabaudiae
Insects described in 1930